Sadeghi is a surname. It means honest.

People with the surname Sadeghi
Afshin Sadeghi, Iranian theater director
Amir Hossein Sadeghi, Iranian footballer
Ebrahim Sadeghi, Iranian football player
Ghotbeddin Sadeghi, Iranian theater director
Jamileh Sadeghi (born 1958), Iranian businesswoman
Manoochehr Sadeghi, Iranian-American Santurist
 Mohammad Sadeghi (footballer, born 1952), Iranian footballer
 Mohammad Bagher Sadeghi (born 1989), Iranian football goalkeeper
 Mohammad Sadeghi (actor) (born 1957), Iranian actor
Reza Sadeghi, Iranian singer

Persian-language surnames